Niels Olsen (born 1988, Guayaquil) is an Ecuadorian entrepreneur and politician. He is the current and eighteenth minister of Tourism in Ecuador.

Early life and education 
Olsen was born and raised in the Guayas Province. Olsen was named after the Danish actor, Niels Olsen. From 2006 to 2010, Olsen studied business administration and marketing at Louisiana State University in the United States. In 2014, earned a master's degree in Sustainable tourism from Monash University in Australia. He also participated in the Society of Latin American Entrepreneurs at Stanford University.

Career 
Olsen served as the project manager for the Hacienda La Danesa tourist project. From 2010 to 2013, he worked as the managing director of Sweet & Coffee, an Ecuadorian coffee shop chain.

On 17 May 2021, the Ecuadorian president, Guillermo Lasso, announced that Olsen would become the country's minister of tourism.

As the minister of tourism, Olsen participated in the inauguration of the 43rd edition of the International Tourism Fair (FITUR), which took place from 18 January 2023, to 22 January 2023. During the event, it was announced that Ecuador will be FITUR's partner country in the next edition.

Personal life 
Olsen is married to Romina Miraglia and they have two children.

References 

Living people
1988 births
Ecuadorian politicians
Louisiana State University alumni